Wulff Land is a peninsula in far northwestern Greenland. Administratively it is a part of the Northeast Greenland National Park.

History
Wulff Land was named after Swedish botanist and Arctic explorer Thorild Wulff (1867–1917), who went with Knud Rasmussen on the Second Thule Expedition and died from fatigue near Cape Agassiz in southern Peabody Bay. 

The Wulff Land peninsula is a barren and inhospitable place. Unlike Peary Land to the NE, no remains of human habitation have been found.

Geography
Wulff Land is located to the northeast of Warming Land and east of Hendrik Island across the Sherard Osborn Fjord. Nares Land lies to the east, across the Victoria Fjord and Stephenson Island to the northeast. Cape May in the Lincoln Sea is its northernmost headland. To the south  the peninsula is attached to the mainland and its ice cap.

Wulff Land  is a largely unglaciated and mountainous peninsula with a large firn cap, The Sven Hedin Firn, in its northern part. There are lakes with a landlocked fjord structure in the southern part where the Blue Cliffs rise above one of the lakes.

In the southwest lies Aage Bistrup Land, and west of it the Ryder Glacier, across which lies Permin Land.

Bibliography
H.P. Trettin (ed.), Geology of the Innuitian Orogen and Arctic Platform of Canada and Greenland. Geological Survey of Canada (1991)

See also
Cartographic expeditions to Greenland

References

External links 
Silurian graptolites from N Greenland - Geological Society

Peninsulas of Greenland